Attorney General Maxwell may refer to:

Augustus Maxwell (1820–1903), Attorney General of Florida
Edwin Maxwell (attorney general) (1825–1903), Attorney General of West Virginia
Maxwell Hendry Maxwell-Anderson, Attorney General of Gibraltar

See also
General Maxwell (disambiguation)